Norway competed at the 2016 European Athletics Championships in Amsterdam, Netherlands, between 6 and 10 July 2016.

Medals

Results
Men

Track & road events

Field Events

Combined events – Decathlon

Women

Track & road events

Field Events

References

European Athletics Championships
2016
Nations at the 2016 European Athletics Championships